La Merope is an opera seria in three acts by Geminiano Giacomelli with a libretto by Apostolo Zeno. It was dedicated to Karl August, Prince of Waldeck and Pyrmont. It was first performed in 1734 at the Teatro Grimani di San Giovanni Grisostomo in Venice. The stage designer was Alessandro Mauro, the costume designer was Natale Canciani and the choreographer was Francesco Aquilante.

Music
The opera contains the famous aria "Sposa, non mi conosci" sung by the character Epitide. It was later used by Vivaldi in his  pasticcio Bajazet and it was now called "Sposa son disprezzata", because of the new text.  Another aria is "Quell'usignolo" (also sung by Epitide) which also had been recorded many times, and the aria is also known for its difficult coloratura part. The full opera has never been recorded.

Roles

References
 Libretto
 http://www.quellusignolo.fr/

External links

Operas
1734 operas
Italian-language operas